Monmouthshire is a county and principal area of Wales. It borders Torfaen and Newport to the west; Herefordshire and Gloucestershire (in England) to the east; and Powys to the north. The largest town is Abergavenny, with other large settlements being Chepstow, Monmouth, and Usk. The present county was formed under the Local Government (Wales) Act 1994, and comprises some sixty percent of the historic county. Between 1974 and 1996, the county was known by the ancient title of Gwent, recalling the mediaeval Welsh kingdom. The county is 850 km2 (330 sq mi) in extent, with a population of 93,200 .

The Cadw/ICOMOS Register of Parks and Gardens of Special Historic Interest in Wales was established in 2002 and given statutory status in 2022. Its heightened status reflected an increased recognition of the importance of historic landscapes; Elisabeth Whittle, president of the Welsh Historic Gardens Trust writing, "historic parks and gardens are an integral part of the Welsh archaeological and architectural heritage." The register is administered by Cadw, the historic environment agency of the Welsh Government.  It includes just under 400 sites, covering the gardens and parkland of private houses, historic deer parks, cemeteries, common land and public parks, which are recorded by principal area. Sites are listed at one of three grades, matching the grading system used for listed buildings. Grade I is the highest grade, for landscapes of exceptional interest; Grade II*, the next highest, denotes parks and gardens of more than special interest; while Grade II denotes nationally important sites of special interest.

There are 48 registered parks and gardens in Monmouthshire. Five are listed at grade I, nine at grade II*, and thirty-four at grade II. They include two deer parks, three urban parks, a cemetery and, the most common categories, the gardens of private houses and the parklands of country estates. The earliest sites are the mediaeval deer parks, while the 16th and 17th centuries saw the construction of the “outstandingly important” gardens at Raglan Castle. The 18th and 19th centuries brought the county’s best Gothic Revival work at Clytha Park, and its finest Picturesque landscape at Piercefield House. In the 20th century Henry Avray Tipping created four gardens, all of which feature at Grade II* on the Cadw /ICOMOS Register.

Key

List of parks and gardens

|}

See also

 List of scheduled monuments in Monmouthshire
 Grade I listed buildings in Monmouthshire
 Grade II* listed buildings in Monmouthshire

Notes

References

Sources
 
 
 
 
 
 
 
 
 

Monmouthshire
History of Monmouthshire